Eddy L. Harris (born January 26, 1956) is an American writer of creative nonfiction and a filmmaker.

Early life
Harris was born in Indianapolis, Indiana, and moved to St. Louis, Missouri at 18 months. He graduated from the Saint Louis Priory School and Stanford University.  Harris has worked as a Visiting Writer in Residence at Washington University in St. Louis and as a faculty member in Goucher College's writing program, and lives in France.

Writing career
Harris published his first work, Mississippi Solo, an account of his journey by canoe down the entire length of the nation's major waterway, in 1988.  This work combined aspects of journalism, travel writing, autobiography and memoir, and personal reflection, and, as with Harris's subsequent works, focused specifically on questions of African-American identity in relation to history and place.  Mississippi Solo was the 2003-2004 selection of Missouri ReadMOre, a statewide book-reading program, and Harris received the Missouri Governor's Humanities Award for this work in 2004.

His second book, Native Stranger, a critical and unsparing account of his journey through Africa, led to a loss of some Black readers. Instead of a valentine, Harris described the poverty and corruption he witnessed in many places, as well as the despair he both saw and felt at times.  He has said in an interview that after the book's publication, some Black readers even showed up at readings to denounce him.

His third book, South of Haunted Dreams describes Harris’s solo motorcycle trip through the deep South.

In a 2005 interview with Missy Raterman and Zoe Wexler in nidus, a literary and arts journal based at the University of Pittsburgh, Harris described his work as "certainly travel, because it has some aspects of travel in it, though it isn't like Paul Theroux's travel books. Essay works best for me because I just like the idea of being an essayist. It is memoirist because it is me and my memories – but that's a marketing thing."  In the same interview, he questioned the automatic categorization of him as a "Black" writer and its effects on how his work might be read, though he also acknowledged his desire for his work to create bridges both within and outside Black culture.

Practically unrecognized in the USA and nearly out of print, Harris now lives in France where he has been awarded the 21st (2007) Prix du Livre en Poitou-Charentes for Still Life in Harlem (published as Harlem in France). His work has been acknowledged by the Centre national du livre, notably for Jupiter et Moi, a memoir about the life of a black man and his son.  His most recent book to have been published is "Paris en noir et black" (Liana Levi, 2009), a translation of Paris Reflected in Black and White, translated by Jean Guiloineau.

In 2014, Harris began producing a documentary film about his second canoe journey down the Mississippi River, River to the Heart, which screened on November 4, 2017 at the St. Louis International Film Festival. In an interview posted on Bending Branches website, Harris described the film by stating that "he wanted to experience and then show others that no matter what our color, the more we know each other the less we fear, and the more unity we’ll have as a country."

Literary influences
James Baldwin
Truman Capote
John Steinbeck

Books

Mississippi Solo, 1988.
Native Stranger, 1992. (Selected as a "Notable Book of 1992" by The New York Times)
South of Haunted Dreams, 1993.
Still Life in Harlem, 1996. (Selected as a "Notable Book of 1997" by The New York Times), translated into French as Harlem, 2007.
Jupiter et Moi, 2005.
Paris en noir et black, 2009.

Films

River to the Heart, 2017. Winner, Best Documentary in Ozark Foothills FilmFest 2018. Website : www.rivertotheheart.com

External links
 Eddy Harris's Website
Rolf Potts' Eddy Harris page
David Talbot's Salon.com Interview with Eddy Harris
 An Interview with Eddy Harris
May 2009 Interview with Eddy Harris
Eddy Harris on Vimeo
Dominique Mantelli "Carving Paris: A Literary interview with Eddy L. Harris" Saint Louis Gateway Heritage Magazine, Vol.21, Spring 2001
 https://hal-normandie-univ.archives-ouvertes.fr/hal-02123585/file/INTERVIEW%20WITH%20EDDY%20L%20Carving%20Paris%20gh.pdf

References

African-American writers
American writers
1956 births
Living people
21st-century African-American people
20th-century African-American people
Washington University in St. Louis faculty
Goucher College faculty and staff
Stanford University alumni